Curtis Bowen (born March 24, 1974 in Kenora, Ontario) is a retired professional ice hockey player. He was drafted in the first round (22nd overall) by the Detroit Red Wings in the 1992 NHL Entry Draft.

Playing career
Bowen rose to prominence in the OHL playing with the Ottawa 67's. He played left wing and helped the 67's in both an offensive and defensive role. After the NHL Draft, Bowen played two more years in the OHL before moving up to the AHL as a member of the Adirondack Red Wings. He made the Canadian National Team in 1995 and 1997. After his most recent national appearance he signed with the Manitoba Moose of the IHL and lead them to a second-place finish in the Midwest Division. Soon after he joined the emerging Elite Ice Hockey League in the United Kingdom. He played for the Nottingham Panthers in 1999 and later signed with the Manchester Storm and the Belfast Giants, spending one and four years respectively with each team. Bowen last played for the Nottingham Panthers in 2005-2006.

Career statistics

Regular season and playoffs

International

Personal life
Bowen was formerly involved with Northern Irish television presenter Christine Bleakley; they broke up in 2003.

External links

1974 births
Adirondack Red Wings players
Belfast Giants players
Canadian ice hockey left wingers
Detroit Red Wings draft picks
Living people
Manchester Storm (1995–2002) players
Manitoba Moose (IHL) players
National Hockey League first-round draft picks
Nottingham Panthers players
Ottawa 67's players
Sportspeople from Kenora
Canadian expatriate ice hockey players in England
Canadian expatriate ice hockey players in the United States
Canadian expatriate ice hockey players in Northern Ireland